The Turin–Milan high-speed railway line is a link in the Italian high-speed rail network. It is part of Corridor 5 of the European Union's Trans-European high-speed rail network, which connects Lisbon and Kyiv. The section between Turin and Novara opened on 10 February 2006, while the remainder opened on 5 December 2009.

The estimated cost of the works is €2,580 million. The flatness of the countryside has allowed 80% (approximately ) of the track to be built at ground level, with a small amount of line built in cuttings, approximately 15% (about ) on viaducts, and about 5% (nearly ) in cut-and-cover tunnel. Among the most important structures is the  Santhià Viaduct and the  Pregnana Milanese Tunnel. Most of the line closely follows the south side of the Milan-Turin Autostrada.

The  section between Turin and Novara was inaugurated on 10 February for the 2006 Olympics in Turin. The  section between Novara and Milan was officially opened on 5 December 2009.

References

See also 
 List of railway lines in Italy

High-speed railway lines in Italy
Railway lines in Piedmont
Railway lines in Lombardy
Railway lines opened in 2006